Gorobinci is a village in the municipality of Sveti Nikole, North Macedonia.

Demographics
On the 1927 ethnic map of Leonhard Schulze-Jena, the village is shown as a Turkish village. According to the 2002 census, the village had a total of 820 inhabitants. Ethnic groups in the village include:

Macedonians 811
Serbs 8
Turks 1

References

Villages in Sveti Nikole Municipality